Chen Han-dian (born July 6, 1984), sometimes credited as Hank Chen, is a Taiwanese actor, host and comedian. He gained initial recognition as an assistant host on the popular talk show Kangsi Coming and is known for parodying famous figures on the sketch show Everybody Speaks Nonsenses II – Hot Pot. In 2012, Chen played his first leading role in the romance film The Soul of Bread and has since appeared in several television, film and theatrical productions.

Selected filmography

Television series

Film

Variety and reality show

Music video appearances

Discography

EP

Singles

Theater

Published works

Awards and nominations

References

External links 

 
 
 
 
 

1984 births
Living people
Taiwanese male television actors
Taiwanese male film actors
Taiwanese television presenters
Taiwanese television personalities
21st-century Taiwanese male actors
Male actors from Kaohsiung
Aletheia University alumni